The Furen Literary Society, also known as the Chinese Patriotic Mutual Improvement Association, or the 'Furen Cultural Society Restoration Association (Foo Yan Man Ser Kwong Fook Hui)', was founded in Colonial Hong Kong in 1892.
 
It was founded by Yeung Ku-wan, together with Tse Tsan-tai and others, with Yeung as their leader.   The guiding principles of the society were: "Open up the people's minds" (開通民智) and "Ducit Amor Patriae" (盡心愛國, "Love your country with all your heart").  Other tenets were:

 To purify the character in the highest possible degree
 To prohibit indulgences in the vices of the world
 To set an example for future young Chinese
 To improve in all possible ways Chinese and foreign knowledge both in a civil and a military point of view
 To obtain a good knowledge of western science and learning: and
 To learn how to be and act as a patriot and how to wipe out the unjust wrong our country has suffered.

The society met in Pak Tsz Lane, Central, Hong Kong.
 
In November 1894, Sun Yat-sen founded the Revive China Society in Honolulu, Hawaii, and, in 1895, the Furen Literary Society was merged into the Hong Kong chapter of the Revive China Society, with help from Yau Lit.   Yeung Kui-wan and Sun became respectively President and Secretary of the Revive China Society.

A memorial park (Pak Tsz Lane Park) to the early revolutionists of the Furen Literary was opened in May, 2011 - just in time for the centenary anniversary of the Xinhai Revolution, which realised the dreams of the members of the Furen Literary Society.

Members
The Society had 16 members, the details of whom 14 are known:

See also

Timeline of Late Anti-Qing Rebellions

Qing dynasty
Chinese revolutionaries